The Supreme Court of Bangladesh is the highest court of law in Bangladesh. It is composed of the High Court Division and the Appellate Division, and was created by Part VI Chapter I (article 94) of the Constitution of Bangladesh adopted in 1972. This is also the office of the Chief Justice, Appellate Division Justices, and High Court Division Justices of Bangladesh. As of January 2023, there are 8 Justices in Appellate Division and 92 Justices (81 are permanent and 11 are additional) in High Court Division.

Structure
The Supreme Court of Bangladesh is divided into two parts: the Appellate Division and the High Court Division. The High Court Division hears appeals from lower courts and tribunals; it also has original jurisdiction in certain limited cases, such as writ applications under Article 101 of the Constitution of Bangladesh, and company and admiralty matters. The Appellate Division has jurisdiction to hear appeals from the High Court Division under article 103 of the constitution of Bangladesh. The Supreme Court is independent of the executive branch, and is able to rule against the government in politically controversial cases.

The Chief Justice of Bangladesh and other judges of the Supreme Court are appointed by the President of Bangladesh with prior mandatory consultation with the Prime Minister. The entry point to the seat of judges in the High Court Division is the post of Additional Judge who are appointed from the practising Advocates of the Supreme Court Bar Association and from the judicial service under the provision of Article 98 of the constitution for a period of two years. The current ratio of such appointment is 80%–20%. Upon successful completion of this period and upon recommendation by the Chief Justice an Additional Judge is appointed permanently by the President of Bangladesh under the provision of Article 95 of the Constitution. The judges of the Appellate Division are also appointed by the President of Bangladesh under the same provision. All such appointments come into effect on and from the date of taking oath by the appointee under the provision of Article 148 of the constitution.

A judge of the Bangladesh Supreme Court holds office until they attain the age of 67 years as extended by the provision of article 95 of Constitution (Thirteenth) Amendment Act, 2004 (Act 14 of 2004). A retiring judge faces disability in pleading or acting before any court or authority or holding any office of profit in the service of the republic, not being a judicial or quasi-judicial office or the office of the Chief Adviser or Adviser.

A Supreme Court judge is not removable from office except in accordance with the provision of Article 96 of the Constitution which provides for Supreme Judicial Council empowering it to remove a judge of the supreme court from office upon allowing the delinquent judge an opportunity of being heard. The supreme judicial council is constituted with the Chief Justice of Bangladesh and next two senior judge of the Appellate Division, provided if at any time the Council inquiring into the capacity or conduct of a judge who is a member of the supreme judicial council, or a member of the council is absent or is unable to act due to illness or other cause, the judge who is the next in seniority to those who are members of the Council shall act as such member.

Supreme court judges are independent in their judicial function as empowered through article 94(4) of the Constitution.

Judgments
As per Article 111 of the Constitution of Bangladesh, 1972, the Supreme Court judgments have binding effects and the article provides that the law declared by the Appellate Division shall be binding on the High Court Division and the law declared by either division of the Supreme Court shall be binding on all courts subordinate to it.

These judgements are usually summarised in the Bangladesh Supreme Court Digest. There are also many law reports which publish the judgments and orders of the Supreme Court. All these law reports are in printed volumes. The Chancery Law Chronicles offers the online service of judgments of Supreme Court of Bangladesh.

Language 
Although Bengali is the only state language of Bangladesh in accordance with the article 3 of the Constitution of Bangladesh, the verdicts given by the judges at the Supreme Court of Bangladesh are frequently in English following the colonial tradition of the British rule, violating the Bengali Language Implementation Act, 1987. Sheikh Hasina, the incumbent and longest serving Prime Minister of Bangladesh, suggested that the judges should deliver their verdicts in Bengali so that every Bangladeshi can read them, and, later on if need be, the verdicts could be translated into English. Muhammad Habibur Rahman, a former Chief Justice of Bangladesh stated that if justice is a virtue and a service to the people, then verdicts should be given in Bengali. He also stated that if the people of the country want that all works in the Supreme Court must be operated in Bengali, then the representatives of the people in the Jatiya Sangsad  (Parliament of Bangladesh) must enact and implement law to ensure the use of Bengali in the Supreme Court.

Justices

Sitting justices of the Appellate Division

Sitting Permanent Judges of the High Court Division
Madam Justice Salma Masud Chowdhury
Justice Muhammad Abdul Hafiz
Justice Dr. Syed Refaat Ahmed
Justice A. K. M. Asaduzzaman
Justice Zubayer Rahman Chowdhury
Justice Md. Rais Uddin
Justice Md. Emdadul Haque Azad
Justice Md. Ataur Rahman Khan
Justice Syed Md. Ziaul Karim
Justice Md. Rezaul Haque
Justice Sheikh Abdul Awal
Justice S. M. Emdadul Hoque
Justice Mamnoon Rahman
Madam Justice Farah Mahbub
Justice Md. Moinul Islam Chowdhury
Madam Justice Naima Haider
Justice Md. Rezaul Hasan
Justice A. N. M. Bashir Ullah
Justice Abdur Rob
Justice Dr. Quazi Reza-Ul Hoque
Justice A. K. M. Zahirul Hoque
Justice Sheikh Md. Zakir Hossain
Justice Md. Habibul Gani
Justice Gobinda Chandra Tagore
Justice Sheikh Hassan Arif
Justice J. B. M. Hassan
Justice Md. Ruhul Quddus
Justice Md. Khasruzzaman
Justice Farid Ahmed
Justice Md. Nazrul Islam Talukder
Justice M Akram Hossain Chowdhury
Justice M Ashraful Kamal
Justice K. M. Kamrul Kader
Justice Md. Mozibur Rahman Miah
Justice Mostofa Zaman Islam
Justice Mohammadullah
Justice Muhammad Khurshid Alam Sarkar
Justice A K M Shahidul Haque
Justice Shahidul Karim
Justice Mohammad Jahangir Hossain
Justice Abu Taher Mohammad Saifur Rahman
Justice Ashish Ranjan Das
Justice Mahmudul Haque
Justice Badruzzaman Badol
Justice Zafar Ahmed
Justice Kazi Md. Ejarul Haque Akondo
Justice Md. Shahinur Islam
Madam Justice Kashefa Hussain
Justice Khizir Ahmed Choudhury
Justice Razik-Al-Jalil
Justice Bhishmadev Chakrabortty
Justice Md. Iqbal Kabir
Justice Md. Salim
Justice Md. Shohrowardi
Justice Md. Abu Ahmed Jamadar
Justice A. S. M. Abdul Mobin
Justice Md Mostafizur Rahman
Madam Justice Fatema Najib
Justice Md. Kamrul Hossain Molla
Justice SM Kuddus Zaman
Justice Md. Atowar Rahman
Justice Khizir Hayat
Justice Shashanka Shekhar Sarkar
Justice Mohammad Ali
Justice Mohi Uddin Shamim
Justice Md. Riaz Uddin Khan
Justice M Khairul Alam
Justice S. M. Moniruzzaman
Justice Ahmed Sohel
Justice Sardar Mohammad Rashed Jahangir
Justice Khondaker Diliruzzaman
Justice KM Hafizul Alam
Justice Muhammad Mahbub-Ul-Islam
Justice Shahed Nuruddin
Justice Md Zakir Hossain
Justice Md Akhtaruzzaman
Justice Md Mahmud Hasan Talukder
Justice Kazi Ebadoth Hossain
Justice K. M. Zahid Sarwar
Justice AKM Zahirul Haque
Madam Justice Kazi Zinat Hoque

Sitting Additional Judges of the High Court Division
Justice Mohammad Showkat Ali Chowdhury 
Justice Md. Atabullah
Justice Biswajit Debnath
Justice Md. Aminul Islam
Justice Md. Ali Reza
Justice Md. Bazlur Rahman
Justice K. M. Emrul Kayesh
Justice Fahmida Quader
Justice Md. Bashir Ullah
Justice S M Masud Hossain Dolon
Justice A. K. M. Rabiul Hassan

Former Chief Justice Surandra Kumar Sinha was the first justice appointed from Monipuri or any minority Ethnic groups in Bangladesh. Former Justice Bhabani Prasad Sinha is also from the same community.

Madame Justice Nazmun Ara Sultana was the first ever female justice, and Madame Justice Krishna Debnath is the first female Hindu justice of Bangladesh. There are currently seven female justices in the supreme court.

Controversy
In 2004, Justice Syed Shahidur Rahman was terminated by President Iajuddin Ahmed on corruption allegation. 

Former Chief Justice Mohammad Fazlul Karim withheld the oath taking of Justice Md. Ruhul Quddus (Babu) as he was involved in the murder of Aaslam, a pro-Jamaat-e-Islami Bangladesh student of Rajshahi University, on 17 November 1988, when he was a leader of Jatiyo Samajtantrik Dal (JSD), and Justice Mohammad Khosruzzaman was overtly involved in contempt of court on 30 November 2006.

Justice Shah Abu Nayeem Mominur Rahman, an appellate division judge, first ever among these judges, resigned on 12 May 2011 due to supersession, as he was presumed to be the Chief Justice of Bangladesh on 18 May 2011.

Justice Mohammad Nizamul Huq resigned from the post of International Crimes Tribunal (ICT)-1 chairman on 11 December 2012 amid controversy for holding Skype conversations with an expatriate Bangladeshi legal expert based in Belgium.

President of Bangladesh ordered for formation of a Supreme Judicial Council to investigate alleged misconduct of High Court judge Justice Mizanur Rahman Bhuiyan after he distributed copies of a 17 February The Daily Inqilab report, termed slain (on 15 February 2013) 2013 Shahbag protests activist and blogger Ahmed Rajib Haider was a moortad (heretic), among the justices of the Supreme Court of Bangladesh.

Justice A B M Altaf Hossain was not confirmed as a permanent justice on 12 June 2014 despite recommendation from the Chief Justice of Bangladesh. So he has served legal notices to the top bureaucrats of Bangladesh government to reinstate him within 72 hours.

Chief Justice Surendra Kumar Sinha resigned on 11 November 2017 from Singapore while on a leave, and transiting from Australia to Canada. Later on former Chief Justice Surendra Kumar Sinha was sentenced in absentia to 11 years in jail for money laundering and criminal breach of trust. 

Former justice  AHM Shamsuddin Chowdhury Manik, a judge of the appellate Division of Supreme Court of Bangladesh gained notoriety for number of controversies.In 2003, he accused traffic police officers of contempt of court for not saluting his car while it was passing. The then Inspector General of Police of Bangladesh Police, Shahudul Haque, issued a rejoinder that said traffic police are under no obligations to salute anyone and they could do so if it was safe. Bangladesh High Court bench of Justice M A Matin and Justice Syed Refat Ahmedissued a contempt of court charge against Haque which automatically removed him from the post of Inspector General according to the law. The government of Bangladesh secured a presidential pardon that protected Haque's job.  

He was also criticised for his vitriolic attack on various politicians including Speaker and members of the Parliament.

See also
 Caretaker Government of Bangladesh
 Executive Magistrate of Bangladesh

References

External links
 
 Ministry of Law, Justice and Parliamentary Affairs, Bangladesh
 Bangladesh Bar Council
 Chancery Law Chronicles-First ever Online Database of Bangladesh Laws
 Bangladesh Law Digest – BDLD

Government of Bangladesh
Bangladesh
 
1972 establishments in Bangladesh
Courts and tribunals established in 1972